Parvez Irani Diniar (born 7 March 1954) is an Indian basketball player. He competed in the men's tournament at the 1980 Summer Olympics.

References

External links
 
 Olympic.org Profile
 Parvez Irani Diniar at Eurosport

1954 births
Living people
People from Cuttack
Basketball players from Odisha
Irani people
Indian men's basketball players
Olympic basketball players of India
Basketball players at the 1980 Summer Olympics